In music publishing, a ringle was an attempt to revitalize the CD market by bundling a song in both full single form and a shortened ringtone version on the same disc.

Conceived by Sony BMG Music Entertainment, a 'ringle' consisted of three songs, including the advertised single along with a remix or possibly another song from the same artist, as well as a mobile phone ringtone and a program allowing the purchaser to transfer the ringtone to their mobile phone. Sony BMG stated that 50 ringles would be released between October and November 2007 in the USA, while Universal Music Group would release up to 20. Bloggers at the time likened the move to "re-arranging the deck chairs on the Titanic", while the Sydney Morning Herald stated the concept "could be a case of too little, too late."

In cycling: In 1988, industrial designer and engineer Geoff Ringle invented the Cam-Over style quick release skewer, setting the standard design for all quick releases since, and ushered in an entire era of high performance cycling equipment using aerospace materials and engineering. While the skewer was unique in its simple, efficient design, its method of construction, being CNC machined from aluminum, brightly anodized, and built around titanium hardware marked a radical departure from traditional industrial design. In this way, Ringle revolutionized bicycle design away from the weak and heavy stamped and welded steel mass production parts of the previous century. He ultimately designed an entire product line of stems, seatposts, headsets, cable hangers, and water bottle cages, each in a minimalistic, clean, efficient design, each machined from aluminum alloy and using titanium hardware, without any steel or weldments.  By the late 90's, he sold Ringle Components to Sun Rims, and ultimately the Hayes Group, who discontinued the products in favor of outsourcing a small range of low quality, welded parts in drab colors, effectively killing the brand.

References

Mobile phone culture
Single types